Ladrones Islands may refer to:

 Islas de los Ladrones, the old name for a series of islands under U.S. jurisdiction in the Pacific Ocean, now known as the Mariana Islands
 Ladrones Islands, part of the Wanshan Archipelago, in Guangdong Province, China
 Los Ladrones, islands in the Gulf of Chiriquí, Panama

See also
 Ladrones (disambiguation)